The 2019 season was Kristiansund's third season in the Eliteserien, the top football division in Norway, where they finished 6th and reached the Fourth Round of the Cup.

Squad

Transfers

Winter

In:

Out:

Summer

In:

Out:

Competitions

Eliteserien

Results summary

Results by round

Results

Table

Norwegian Cup

Squad statistics

Appearances and goals

|-
|colspan="14"|Players away from Kristiansund on loan:
|-
|colspan="14"|Players who left Kristiansund during the season:

|}

Goal scorers

Disciplinary record

References

External links

Kristiansund BK seasons
Kristiansund